Catocala mcdunnoughi, or McDunnough's underwing, is a moth of the family Erebidae. The species was first described by Auburn Edmund Brower in 1937. It is found in the US state of California.

Adults are on wing from June to August. There is probably one generation per year.

The larvae feed on Quercus chrysolepis.

References

External links
Species info

mcdunnoughi
Moths described in 1937
Moths of North America